Yevgeni Gennadyevich Yefremov (born 20 July 1979) is a former Russian professional football player.

Club career
He played two seasons in the Russian Football National League for FC Spartak-Orekhovo Orekhovo-Zuyevo and FC Dynamo Makhachkala.

References

External links
 

1979 births
Living people
Russian footballers
Association football midfielders
FC Volga Nizhny Novgorod players
FC Zhemchuzhina Sochi players
FC Sever Murmansk players
FC Znamya Truda Orekhovo-Zuyevo players
FC Dynamo Makhachkala players